Air Officer Scotland is the senior Royal Air Force officer in Scotland. At present, Air Vice-Marshal R Paterson is a reservist. 

In 1962, the Air Officer Scotland assumed responsibility for Northern Ireland, become Air Officer Scotland and Northern Ireland. 

In December 1994 the AOSNI post departed Pitreavie Castle (the AOC Northern Maritime Air Region post was being disestablished). The station commander of RAF Leuchars become an air commodore with the additional role of being Air Officer Scotland and Northern Ireland.

The Royal Navy equivalent is Flag Officer Scotland and Northern Ireland while the British Army equivalent is General Officer Scotland.

Air Officers Scotland
List Incomplete

 1 October 1968 Air Vice Marshal Frederick Hughes, Air Officer Commanding, No. 18 Group RAF and Air Officer Scotland and Northern Ireland

c.1986 Air Vice-Marshal David Conway Grant Brook, Air Officer Scotland and Northern Ireland Placed on the Retired List 1989 at own request.
July 1989 Air Vice Marshal Jim Morris, to be Air Officer Scotland and Northern Ireland, based at RAF Pitreavie Castle, the home of the Northern Maritime Air Region, No. 18 Group RAF.
c.1995 becomes an additional appointment for Station Commander, RAF Leuchars
2001 Air Commodore M J Routledge
2004 Air Commodore S Bryant
2006 Air Commodore J Stinton
March 2007 Air Commodore C A Bairsto
13 March 2009 – 12 September 2011 Air Commodore R J Atkinson
12 September 2011 – 13 February 2013 Air Commodore G D A Parker
13 February 2013 – 17 November 2014 Air Commodore G M D Mayhew
17 November 2014 – Present Air Vice-Marshal R Paterson

References

Royal Air Force appointments
Military of Scotland